Kaifun, (also transliterated Kafun, Kaifounm, and Keyfoun) is a medium-sized village in the Mount Lebanon Governorate, Aley District, in the Republic of Lebanon. It lies slightly south of the village of Souk El Gharb.  Keifoun is around 800m above sea level with views of Beirut (26 km away) and the Mediterranean sea. Keifoun is a popular summer recreational destination for Beirut residents.

History
In 1838, Eli Smith noted  the place, called Keifun, located in El-Ghurb el-Fokany; Upper el-Ghurb.

References

Bibliography

Populated places in Aley District